Sir John Chapman, 2nd Baronet (c. 1710 – 29 January 1781) was a British parliamentarian.

He succeeded to the Baronetcy in May 1737.

He was elected at the 1741 general election as a Member of Parliament (MP) for Taunton, and held the seat until the 1741 general election, when he did not stand again. He served as High Sheriff of Hertfordshire for 1759.

He married twice: firstly Rachel, daughter and coheir of James Edmondson and secondly Sarah. He had no children and was succeeded by his brother, Sir William Chapman, 3rd Baronet.

References

1710 births
1781 deaths
Members of the Parliament of Great Britain for English constituencies
British MPs 1741–1747
High Sheriffs of Hertfordshire
Baronets in the Baronetage of Great Britain
Chapman baronets